Zion Evangelical Church is a historic United Church of Christ church located in downtown Evansville, Indiana. It was built in 1855, and is a Gothic Revival style brick church.  It features Gothic arched openings and an octagonal steeple.

It was listed on the National Register of Historic Places in 1982.

References

External links

church website

United Church of Christ churches in Indiana
Churches on the National Register of Historic Places in Indiana
Gothic Revival church buildings in Indiana
Churches completed in 1855
Churches in Evansville, Indiana
National Register of Historic Places in Evansville, Indiana